Encephalartos kanga, also known as Mnanasi Pori is a species of cycad in the family Zamiaceae. It is native to Tanzania.

This species is found in Mount Kanga, a hill of the Nguru Mountains in the Mvomero district, Morogoro, Tanzania. They are situated on the southern ridge and south eastern slopes of Mt. Kanga at an altitude between 1,000m and 1,300m.

Etymology 
The name "kanga" originates from the mountain in which the species is situated in, Mount Kanga. The word "kanga" means "jungle-fowl" in local languages.

Description 
It is an arborescent species, with pachycaulous barrel-shaped trunks around 1.5m long, 50 cm in diameter and shiny, dark green leaves. They are also dioecious.

Status 
The Encephalartos kanga is listed as critically endangered by the IUCN. It is a rare species with small populations scattered around Mt. Kanga. Its total area of occupation is less than 10 km2 and the total number of mature individuals is estimated to be less than 50.

Threats 
The mountain, being seen as sacred by the local inhabitants, and its remoteness means that deforestation is not a current problem. The most serious threat to the species is the horticultural trade. There have been instances of foreign collectors entering the area and removing 100-200 seedlings at one time.

Conservation 
They are currently under conservation in the Kanga Forest Reserve.

Uses 
Like all cycads, the Encephalartos kanga is highly sought after by the horticultural trade, especially because it is a new species. However, this also poses a threat to the species.

References 

Critically endangered plants
kanga
Taxa named by Tamás Pócs